Özlüce is a village in Tarsus district of Mersin Province, Turkey. Turkish state highway  is to the south and Turkish motor way    is to the north of the village . The population of Özlüce was 461  as of 2012. Main economic activity is farming and the most pronounced crop is grape .

References

Villages in Tarsus District